Lokomotiv Stadium, is a multi-use stadium in Tashkent, Uzbekistan. It is currently used mostly for football matches and is the home stadium of Lokomotiv Tashkent.

The stadium was built on the site of Traktor Tashkent Stadium. The construction works started in 2009 and finished in 2012. The stadium holds 8,000 people.

The stadium was opened on 11 May 2012 with the 2012 Uzbek League match between Lokomotiv and FK Andijan.

References

External links
Lokomotiv Stadium Photos at lokomotiv.uz
Stadium information

Football venues in Uzbekistan